Paul Hesselbach (born 6 July 1951) is a retired German football goalkeeper and later manager.

References

1951 births
Living people
German footballers
1. FC Nürnberg players
FC Amberg players
KFC Uerdingen 05 players
Borussia Mönchengladbach players
SC Paderborn 07 players
Stuttgarter Kickers players
Association football goalkeepers
Bundesliga players
2. Bundesliga players
German football managers
SpVgg Greuther Fürth managers